The 2023 season is the third season of the Barcelona Dragons franchise in the European League of Football. After winning the Southern Conference championship in 2022, they now play in the new Western Conference.

Preseason
Dragons' Offseason has been strongly marked by the departure of head coach Andrew Weidinger to Rhein Fire as well as the departures of key contributors Kyle Sweet (WR) and Zach Edwards (QB) to Paris Musketeers, and Alejandro Fernandez (DE) to Rhein Fire.  As a result, the franchise decided to promote defensive coordinator of the 2022 season, Gabriel "Black" Sánchez, to the head coach position.

Another important event this Offseason has been the announcement of the new venue for the 2023 season. After two years playing in Reus (Tarragona), the franchise decides to move closer to Barcelona Metropolitan area in an attempt to secure the financial viability of the franchise. On the 10th of March, the franchise announces the "Estadi Olimpic de Terrassa" as their new venue for the 2023 season.

Regular season

Standings

Roster

Staff

Pre-Season Signings 

17th March 2023. S Lautaro Frecha re-signs for the 2023 season.

13th March 2023. OL Diego Varela signs for the 2023 season. The 24 years old spaniard joins Dragons from Las Rozas Black Demons where he won the Spanish Cup in 2022.

11th March 2023. DT Daniel Franco re-signs for the 2023 season.

7th March 2023. DE Rodrigo Sanz signs for the 2023 season. Rodrigo Sanz comes from Osos Rivas where he won the LNFA Serie A championship in 2022.

4th March 2023. Guillermo Mora is announced as Dragons Head of data and analytics for the 2023 season. This will be Guillermo's 2nd season with the team. 

3rd March 2023. DT Daniel Lopez signs for the 2023 season. The 24 years old spaniard joins Dragons from Las Rozas Black Demons where he won the Spanish Cup in 2022. In the early stages of his career, he won 2 Junior Spanish Championships and was called up to play with Team Spain U-19.

28th February 2023. Marc Aurellano re-signs as Defensive Line Assistant coach and Defense Scout for the 2023 season. He is also part of the L'Hospitalet Pioners Dragons Academy program as a Defensive Coordinator.

27th February 2023. K/P Luis Cereceda re-signs for the 2023 season.

25th February 2023. RB Eduard Molina signs for the 2023 season. Eduard Molina comes from Badalona Dracs where he won the LNFA Serie A championship in 2021. He moved to Denmark for a short stint in 2021  where he reached the final of the Danish 1st Division with the Sollerod Gold Diggers.

24th February 2023. Eduardo Yagues Nuño is announced as Dragons OL Coach for the 2023 season. The 60 years old Mexican native brings 28 years of OL coaching experience with City College of San Francisco (JUCO) where he has won 9 national championships.

20th February 2023. TE Raul Cernuda signs for the 2023 season. The 26 years old Mallorca native started playing in his hometown team Mallorca Voltors and was part of the team that promoted to Spanish 1st Division in 2014. His performances didn't go unnoticed and signs for Spanish powerhouse Badalona Dracs where he wins 5 Spanish leagues, 5 Spanish Cups and league MVP honors in 2017.

17th February 2023. OL David Culebras signs for the 2023 season. Previously played for Las Rozas Black Demons of the LNFA Serie A where he won the Spanish Cup in 2022. Before that, he won the Junior Spanish Bowl and Cup in 2021 with Black Demons young teams. He has been also selected for the senior Spanish national team.

15th February 2023. Alexander Durazo is announced as Dragons Special Teams & LB Coordinator for the 2023 season. He has held multiple coaching positions in countries like Norway, Switzerland and Spain.

11th February 2023. Samuel Eisenstadt is announced as Dragons DB Assistant coach for the 2023 season. Former DB player at Fair Haven HS and Elon University where he got CAA Academic All-Conference honors. As a coach in Europe, he started his career in Sweden taking the Head Coach position at Örebro Black Knights and winning Swedish Championship and HC of the year honors. Then, he moves to Spain to become Head Coach of Las Rozas Black Demons where he wins the Spanish Cup in December 2022.

8th February 2023. OL Mikel Gómez re-signs for the 2023 season.

5th February 2023. Chase Baker is announced as Dragons DL coach for the 2023 season. This will be Chase's 2nd season with the team. 

1st February 2023. FS Jorge Félix Velasco re-signs for the 2023 season.

24th January 2023. WR Melvin Palin signs for the 2023 season. 26 years old Palin previously played for the Düsseldorf Panther in the GFL after graduating from the Bishop’s Gaiters in Canada last year. Before that, he was active for the Vulkins of Victoriaville in Canada and the Kelted Quimper in France. He was selected for the French national team.

23rd January 2023. Stefano Scarpitti is announced as Dragons RB coach for the 2023 season. Stefano comes from the Torino Giaguari where he has performed different coaching duties over the past years. 

17th January 2023. LB Victor Albarracin re-signs for the 2023 season.

13th January 2023. DL Sebastian Bowen re-signs for the 2023 season.

10th January 2023. OL Jose Ariza re-signs for the 2023 season.

6th January 2023. WR Austin Duke signs for the 2023 season. All time leading receiver in receptions, receiving yards and receiving TD at University of North Carolina. As undrafted free agent,  he spent the NFL 2017 season on the practice squad of the Carolina Panthers and was released at the end of 2018 preseason. After joining different teams in AAF and CFL, he finally joined the New York Guardians of the XFL in 2020 where he became one of the best players, especially as a punt returner. 

3rd January 2023. LB Cesare Brugnani re-signs for the 2023 season.

30th December 2022. DB Luke Glenna signs for the 2023 season. The American comes from the University of St Thomas Minnesota (NCAA D-1). He earned All American team and All Conference first team honors in 2022.

28th December 2022. LB Manuel Fernandez signs for the 2023 season. The spaniard played Spanish top division with Fuengirola Potros from 2019 to 2022. In 2021, he moved to Finland to play with Pori Bears in 2nd division where he reached Semifinals. In 2022, he joins the Ravensburg Razorbacks of the GFL. 

25th December 2022. QB Conor Miller signs for the 2023 season. The American comes from the Leipzig Kings where he joined mid-season and played 3 games before going down with a season ending injury. Previously, he won the french ELITE League with the Flash La Courneuve in 2022 and led the AFL in passing yards with the Graz Giants in 2021. 

22nd December 2022. OL Ben Dixon signs for the 2023 season. The British comes from the Hamburg Huskies of the GFL2. Previously, he played for Carnegie American Football during 4 years where he won the BUCS Championship in 2019. In 2021, Ben joined the Sheffield Giants and was awarded the Offensive Line MVP of the season. 

19th December 2022. CB Jordi Brugnani re-signs for the 2023 season.

14th December 2022. Victor Martin is announced as Dragons WR coach for the 2023 season. This will be Victor's 3rd season with the team. 

12th December 2022. WR Theodor Landstrom signs for the 2023 season. The Swedish comes from the Telfs Patriots of the AFL.

9th December 2022. OL Elvys Nuñez re-signs for the 2023 season.

5th December 2022. DE Darius Slade signs for the 2023 season. Former NCAA D-1 player after stints at Ohio State, Arizona State and South Florida between 2014 and 2019.

1st December 2022. CB Lucas Masero re-signs for the 2023 season.

27th November 2022. LB Alex "Posito" González re-signs for the 2023 season.

23rd November 2022. LB Hugo Dyrendhal signs for the 2023 season. DPOY of the AFL in 2022 playing for Telfs Patriots and CFL Stockholm Combine participant in 2020.

18th November 2022. WR Jordi Torrededia re-signs for the 2023 season.

14th November 2022. Miguel "Micky" Romero is announced as Dragons OC & QB coach for the 2023 season. Romero has extense coaching experience in Mexico. Twice ONEFA Major League champion and 1 time FAM YOX National champion. 

12th November 2022. LB Sebastian Castañer re-signs for the 2023 season.

8th November 2022. RB Toni Monton re-signs for the 2023 season.

2nd November 2022. Genaro Alfonsin is announced as Dragons DB Coach & Strength Conditioning for the 2023 season. Alfonsin has coaching experience in the Mexican LFA. As a player, he played in his native country, Mexico, and in the CFL with the Edmonton Elks.

14th September 2022. Gabriel "Black" Sanchez is announced as Dragons Head Coach for the 2023 season. Coach "Black" was Dragons Defensive coordinator and Defensive Backs coach during 2022 season.

Pre-Season News 

10th March 2023. Barcelona Dragons announce an agreement with Terrassa city council and local soccer club ,Terrassa FC, to make the "Estadi Olimpic de Terrassa" the new venue where Dragons will play in the 2023 season. The agreement is for one year. "Estadi Olimpic de Terrassa" has a capacity for 11.500 seats. 

12th February 2023. "The combine tour 2023" takes its third stop at Salou (Barcelona).

4th February 2023. "The Mini Monster" camp organized by Chicago Bears together with Dragons Academy Pioners takes place.

28th January 2023. "The combine tour 2023" takes its second stop at Coslada (Madrid).

19th January 2023. Barcelona Dragons Academy announces that "The Mini Monster" camp aimed at kids between 8 and 15 years of age will take place in Hospitalet next February. This is jointly organized with Chicago Bears of the NFL. 

14th January 2023. "The combine tour 2023" takes its first stop at Cascais (Portugal).

2nd December 2022. Bodegas Yzaguirre is announced as sponsor for "the combine tour 2023"

30th November 2022. Barcelona Dragons launch the campaign "become a member". This campaign is aimed at fans willing to further support the team by paying a small annual fee.

6th November 2022. 3 Dragons players make the top 10 in the ELF top 50 players list released by elf.network and elfcheckdown.ig. Zach Edwards (#1), Kyle Sweet (#3) and Alejandro Fernandez (#9). Michael Sam (#23) and Anthony Rodrigues (#46) make the list too. 

25th October 2022. Barcelona Dragons announce the renewal of the agreement with "Carnet Jove" for 2023 season.

18th October 2022. Zach Edwards, Kyle Sweet and Alejandro Fernandez make the 2022 ELF AllStars awards by the prestigious web AmericanFootballInternational.com

17th October 2022. 25 players of Barcelona Dragons are selected to represent Spain against Ireland in the European Championship.

12th October 2022. Barcelona Dragons announce Marc Aurellano as Defensive Coordinator of the "Dragons Academy". 

4th October 2022. Barcelona Dragons announce "The Combine Tour 2023". Tryouts for the 2023 season will take place in 4 different cities. 

27th September 2022. Zach Edwards, Kyle Sweet and Alejandro Fernandez make the 2022 ELF First Team awards by the web elfcheckdown.ig

10th September 2022. Barcelona Dragons signs agreement with historical Spanish team "L'Hospitalet Pioners" to jointly create the "Dragons Academy Pioners" to compete in Youth Spanish Divisions.

9th September 2022. Barcelona Dragons announce Chase Baker as the first Head Coach of the "Dragons Academy". Chase Baker has been the Defensive Line coach of the Barcelona Dragons during 2022 season.

6th September 2022. Barcelona Dragons announce that shares to become a shareholder of the franchise can be purchased in the team's website. A maximum of 2000 shares at a price of 200 euros each are made available.

1st September 2022. Barcelona Dragons launch the "Dragons Academy" aimed at players between the ages of 14 to 18. This is an attempt to build a youth team program directly linked to the franchise.

References

Barcelona Dragons (ELF) seasons
2023 in Spanish sport
Barcelona Dragons